La Quinta Inns & Suites (Spanish: La Quinta, "the country villa") is a chain of limited service hotels in the United States, Canada, Mexico, and Honduras. La Quinta Holdings, Inc. first sold shares to the public in April 2014. La Quinta has headquarters in Irving, Texas. As of December 31, 2018, the company owns and operates 914 properties with 89,456 rooms.

History

1968 launch 

The first La Quinta Inn location was opened in 1968 by real estate entrepreneur Sam Barshop (1929–2013) and his brother Phil (1935–1998) in San Antonio, Texas, across the street from the site of HemisFair '68 World's Fair.

La Quinta's first headquarters were in San Antonio. In 1999 the company announced it was going to move, transferring over 100 jobs from city to city. The company cited the lack of nonstop flights from San Antonio International Airport as a reason for moving. The company wished to have its headquarters near Dallas/Fort Worth International Airport, a large airport. The company kept around 300 employees who worked in accounting, information systems, and reservations in San Antonio.

2005 Blackstone acquisition 

LQ Corporation, the parent company to subsidiary LQ Properties, Inc, announced on November 9, 2005, that it had agreed to be acquired by the private-equity firm Blackstone Group for $3.4 billion in cash and debt.  The merger closed on January 25, 2006. At that point, the La Quinta group ranked 13th hotel group worldwide, owned 360 hotels, and franchised 250 under the names La Quinta Inns, La Quinta Inn & Suites, Baymont Inn & Suites, Woodfield Suites and Budgetel (about 65,000 rooms). Blackstone had just bought Wyndham Hotels a few months before, the hotel group that would acquire La Quinta in 2018.

In 2011, La Quinta gave up on pay-per-view in-room entertainment to focus on letting customers use their own devices. In 2012, La Quinta launched the Instant hold option, allowing customers to make last-minute reservations with their phone numbers.

In 2013, Blackstone started to pave the way for the sale of La Quinta. Up until the 2014 stock offering, all La Quinta properties were owned or franchised by the company's subsidiary La Quinta Properties, Inc., a real estate investment trust (REIT), which leased the properties back to the parent company. In 2015, La Quinta launched its Del Sol prototype featuring LED lighting, indoor and outdoor pools, and a modernized decoration. In September 2015, the President and CEO Wayne Goldberg stepped down. CFO Keith Cline became the interim CEO.

2018 Wyndham acquisition 

On January 18, 2018, Wyndham Worldwide Corporation and La Quinta Holdings Inc. announced they had entered into a definitive agreement under which Wyndham Worldwide will acquire La Quinta's hotel franchise and hotel management businesses for $1.95 billion in cash. The loyalty programs of La Quinta and Wyndham were planned to be combined into a single one. The deal also included that La Quinta's real estate be spun off into a separate company, CorePoint Lodging, a publicly-traded real estate investment trust. Buying La Quinta enabled Wyndham to become the third-largest hotel rooms operator in the world, pipping InterContinental. The acquisition was completed on May 31, 2018 adding over 900 franchised hotel properties to the Wyndham portfolio.

In June 2019, La Quinta signed a deal with the Caribbean developer Profusion Group to engage in the rapid development of the brand in the Dominican Republic (8 locations in 5 years).

Description 

La Quinta in some Spanish-speaking countries means "the country place"; it also could mean "mansion".

Room types and settings vary by hotel. The price rate changes daily, and Company-owned hotels are standardized. Franchised hotels vary more. The hotel chain targets middle-income, price-conscious travelers. The reservation cancellation fees are flexible. Most properties have a pool.

LQ Management LLC, the owner, has its headquarters in the Las Colinas area of Irving, Texas, near Dallas.

References

External links 
 Official website

The Blackstone Group companies
Hotel chains in the United States
Wyndham brands
Companies based in Irving, Texas
Private equity portfolio companies
Companies formerly listed on the New York Stock Exchange
Hotels established in 1968
1968 establishments in Texas
2014 initial public offerings
2018 mergers and acquisitions